Stephen John Gageler  (born 5 July 1958) is a Justice of the High Court of Australia. He was previously a barrister based in Sydney and the Solicitor-General of Australia, the Commonwealth's second-ranking law officer.

Early life and education
Gageler was born and raised in Sandy Hollow, New South Wales, where his father, John, and grandfather, Clive, were sawmillers operating his grandfather's company.

Gageler was influenced to become a lawyer by meeting Bryan Beaumont, at the time the owner of a property near Gageler's boyhood home, who later became a judge of the Federal Court of Australia.

Gageler's primary school education was at a one-teacher school, Giant's Creek Primary School, about 3 km from Sandy Hollow. His secondary education was at Muswellbrook High School. He graduated from the Australian National University with a Bachelor of Economics in 1980 and a Bachelor of Laws with First Class Honours in 1982. He resided at Bruce Hall, the university's oldest residential college, in his third year, and at Ursula Hall for his first two. He became an associate for High Court Justice Sir Anthony Mason. He then studied at Harvard Law School, graduating with a Master of Laws in 1987.

Legal career
Upon return from Harvard Law School, Gageler was called to the bar in Sydney where, for 20 years, he worked as a barrister specialising in constitutional, administrative, revenue and commercial law. He was made a Senior Counsel in 2000. Gageler represented, among others, Betfair, the Humane Society, the ACT Government, and John Howard (the Prime Minister of Australia). Gageler was assistant counsel for the Commercial Radio Enquiry in 1999.

Solicitor-General
Gageler was appointed the Solicitor-General of Australia on 1 September 2008, based in Canberra, Australian Capital Territory. This position is the second law officer of the Commonwealth, advising the Government and appearing as counsel in significant cases.

Gageler defended the Commonwealth unsuccessfully in the Malaysian solution challenge and successfully in the tobacco plain packaging cases in 2012.

High Court of Australia
Gageler's appointment as a Justice of the High Court of Australia was announced on 21 August 2012 by the Attorney-General of Australia, Nicola Roxon, for whom Gageler had worked as Solicitor-General of Australia since 2008. Roxon announced that Gageler would replace Justice William Gummow on his retirement in October 2012.

Gageler is the second solicitor-general to be appointed to the High Court, after Anthony Mason's appointment as Chief Justice in 1987, and the first to be appointed directly to the court with no prior judicial experience – Mason had previously served on the Supreme Court of New South Wales.

Gageler's likeness appears in a painting from 2003 that was commissioned to mark the Court's centenary. The painting depicts the High Court sitting on Tuesday 29 April 2003 to hear the case Purvis v State of New South Wales . The artist, Robert Hannaford, painted the Full Bench (seven member) hearing. Gageler was arguing the case for the appellant and is shown standing at the lectern addressing the court.

Personal
Gageler met his wife, Carla, while at the ANU. They have a daughter and two sons. The family attends a Roman Catholic church, through the influence of Carla, although Gageler considers himself an Anglican.

Gageler has a black belt in taekwondo, a sport that he took up in his early 40s after seeing his sons training. He took three years to attain the black belt. He trains several times a week.

In 2017 Gageler was appointed a Companion of the Order of Australia for eminent service to the law and to the judiciary through contributions in the areas of constitutional, public, international, common and criminal law, to legal reform, education and academic discourse, and to professional organisations.

References

External links
 Painting of 100 years of the High Court; Gageler as advocate

1958 births
Living people
Australian National University alumni
Australian Senior Counsel
Harvard Law School alumni
Justices of the High Court of Australia
Solicitors-General of Australia
Companions of the Order of Australia
Australian male taekwondo practitioners